Costas on the Radio was an American radio show hosted by Bob Costas. It aired weekly on Premiere Radio Networks (affiliates could choose to air the show on Saturdays or Sundays). Although a longtime sportscaster who is best known for his work on NBC Sports, Costas discussed many issues besides sports, interviewing celebrities and newsmakers in a format similar to that of fellow broadcaster Larry King's radio days.

The show began its run on September 16, 2006. Costas on the Radio succeeds Costas Coast to Coast, a syndicated call-in radio show hosted by Costas from 1986 to 1996.

The show ended its run on May 31, 2009.

The show was created by Sean Compton and Costas.

Format
Each two-hour show featured Costas administering one or two longform interviews (usually lasting for an entire hour) of various athletes, sports book authors, journalists, and other entertainers and newsmakers not necessarily involved in the sports industry. Guests usually appeared in studio, but interviews were occasionally conducted over the telephone. Costas described the show in a promo as having "something for everyone."

Special features
Packaged with the show were the daily minute-long Costas Cut and Costas Minute features, for sports and news/talk stations respectively. The features included bits from prior interviews on the main show.

Syndication
Each show was recorded on Thursday afternoon, and Premiere Radio fed the program to its affiliates via satellite four times each weekend.

The show originated from New York City or St. Louis and was syndicated across the United States and Canada, on over 220 AM and FM stations, by Premiere Radio Networks. It also aired three times each weekend on XM Talk Radio 165.

Guests
Guests of Costas on the Radio included (but are not limited to) the following:

Kareem Abdul-Jabbar, former National Basketball Association player
Ben Affleck, actor
Lance Armstrong, 7-time Tour de France-winning cyclist
Tiki Barber, former New York Giants running back
Chuck Berry, musician
Gary Bettman, National Hockey League commissioner
Brian Billick, former Baltimore Ravens Head Coach
Larry Bird, former National Basketball Association player
Bill Bradley, former U.S. Senator and New York Knicks forward
Mark Brunell, New York Jets quarterback.
Joe Buck, Fox MLB/NFL announcer
Frank Caliendo, comedian/impressionist, best known for his impersonation of John Madden
Linda Cohn, anchor on ESPN's SportsCenter
Dabney Coleman, actor
Cris Collinsworth, NBC Sports and NFL Network
Kevin Costner, actor
Chili Davis, former Major League Baseball designated hitter
Frank Deford, sportswriter
Dan Dierdorf, former St. Louis Cardinals lineman and current NFL on CBS commentator
Héctor Elizondo, actor
Roger Goodell, National Football League Commissioner
Rutger Hauer, actor
Ice Cube, rapper/actor/director
Jerry Jones, Dallas Cowboys principal owner
Richard Karn, actor
John La Puma, physician and host of Lifetime TV's "Health Corner"
Matt Lauer, The Today Show anchor
Mark Linn-Baker, actor
Bernie Mac, actor/comedian
Bill Maher, comedian and host of HBO's Real Time with Bill Maher
Howie Mandel, comedian and host of Deal or No Deal
Matthew McConaughey, actor
Norm Macdonald, comedian and star of Dirty Work.
Seth MacFarlane, creator of Family Guy
John Mellencamp, musician
Al Michaels, NBC Sunday Night Football play-by-play announcer
Jerry O'Connell, actor and star of Sliders
Conan O'Brien, Host of NBC's The Tonight Show
Bill O'Reilly, Fox News Channel commentator
Buster Olney, ESPN.com baseball writer
Mehmet Oz, cardiothoracic surgeon, author and host of The Dr. Oz Show.
Dan Rather, former CBS Evening News anchor
Robin Roberts, Good Morning America anchor
Rachel Robinson, widow of Jackie Robinson
Alex Rodriguez, New York Yankees shortstop
Pete Rose, former Cincinnati Reds manager and first baseman
Chris Sabo, former Cincinnati Reds third baseman
Jeremy Schaap, author and ESPN reporter
Bill Scheft, senior writer for Late Show with David Letterman 
Jason Sehorn, former New York Giants cornerback
Bud Selig, Major League Baseball Commissioner
David Stern, National Basketball Association Commissioner
Darryl Strawberry, former baseball player
Bob Uecker, announcer for the Milwaukee Brewers
Fay Vincent, former Major League Baseball Commissioner
Max Weinberg, drummer for The E Street Band and The Max Weinberg 7 of The Tonight Show
Brian Williams, NBC Nightly News anchor

External links
 Premiere Radio Networks: Costas on the Radio

References

American sports radio programs
American talk radio programs
Radio programs on XM Satellite Radio
2006 radio programme debuts